NBA 09: The Inside is a basketball simulation game developed by San Diego Studio and published by Sony Computer Entertainment. The game was released on October 7, 2008 for the PlayStation 3, PlayStation 2 and PlayStation Portable. The game includes all 30 NBA teams along with 14 of the 16 NBDL teams.

Gameplay
There are four game modes: Quick Play- this mode allows to choose an NBA or D-League team to play in a regular game, Franchise- choosing one NBA team and controlling its player transactions and as a General Manager, The Life- 3 different player stories of a rise from the D-League to the NBA, and NBA Replay- replaying a game played in real life.

Reception

The PSP version received "generally favorable reviews", and the PS3 version received "mixed" reviews, while the PS2 version received "generally unfavorable reviews", according to Metacritic.

References

External links

2008 video games
National Basketball Association video games
PlayStation 3 games
PlayStation 2 games
PlayStation Portable games
Sony Interactive Entertainment games
North America-exclusive video games
Video games developed in the United States
San Diego Studio games